Club Deportivo Juventud Olímpica , commonly known as Juventud Olímpica   was a Salvadoran professional football club based in several locations including Sonsonate, Acajutla and also Barrio Santa Anita, San Salvador.

History
On January 13, 1939 the club merged with Maya to be named Juventus, however one year the club reverted to its old name leaving for Club Maya to become defunct. In 1974–1975, the club rebranded itself as Negocios Internacionales and it only lasted one year reverting to Juventud Olímpica.

Achievements
Salvadoran Primera División: 2
Champions (2):1971, 1973
Runner-up (4): 1952–53, 1963–64, 1972, 1974–75

Records

Club Records
 First Match (prior to creation of a league): vs. TBD (a club from TBD), Year
 First Match (official): vs. TBD, year
 Most points in La Primera: 00 points (00 win, 00 draws, 0 losses) Year/Year
 Least points in La Primera: 00 points (0 win, 0 draws, 00 losses) Year/year

Individual records
 Most capped player for El Salvador: 50 (0 whilst at Juventud Plimpica), TBD
 Most international caps for El Salvador while a Juventud Olimpica player: 1, TBD
 Most goals in a season, all competitions: unknown player, O (Year/year) (00 in League, 00 in Cup competitions)
 Most goals in a season, La Primera: TBD, 7

Concacaf competitions record
{| class="wikitable" align="center"
|-
! Competition
! Played
! Won
! Drawn
! Lost
! GF
! GA
|-
| Copa Interclubes UNCAF || 30 || 6 || 5 || 19 || 25 || 49
|-
| CONCACAF Champions League || 8 || 1 || 3 || 5 || 9 || 12
|-
| TOTAL || 38 || 7 || 8 || 24'' || 34|| 61|}Copa Interclubes UNCAF: 2 appearancesBest: Fifth Place
1973 : Fifth Place
1975 : Sixth PlaceCONCACAF Champions League: 3 appearancesBest''': Second Round
1973 : First Round
1974 : Second Round
1975 : First Round

Notable players
  Orlando “Calulo” Hernández
  Mario Carlos Rey
  Juan Quarterone (1965-1968)

Captains

Notable Coaches

   Luis Comitante (1967)
  Mario Carlos Rey (1971)
  Juan Quarterone (1973)
  Gregorio Bundio (1974)
  Ricardo Tomasino (1974–1975)
  Victor Manuel Ochoa (1975)
  Raúl Magaña (1976)
  Jorge Tupinambá dos Santos
 Santiago Chicas
 Mauro Liberia

References

Juventud Olimpica
2007 disestablishments in El Salvador